Sheykhian-e Shahab (also Romanized as Sheykhīān-e Shahāb) is a village in Kabgan Rural District, Kaki District, Dashti County, Bushehr Province, Iran. At the 2006 census, its population was 82, in 17 families.

References 

Populated places in Dashti County